Fairfield Community School District is a public school district located in Fairfield, Iowa.  The district covers the majority of Jefferson County, extending slightly into Henry, Van Buren, Wappello, and Washington counties.

Schools
The district operates four schools, all in Fairfield:
 Pence Elementary
 Washington Elementary
 Fairfield Middle School
 Fairfield High School

Fairfield High School

Athletics
The Trojans compete in the Southeast Conference in the following sports:

Baseball
Basketball 
 Girls' 1983 Class 3A State Champions  
Cross Country 
 Boys' 1949 Class A State Champions
Football
Golf 
Soccer 
Softball 
Tennis 
Track and Field 
Volleyball
Wrestling

See also
List of school districts in Iowa
List of high schools in Iowa

References

1868 establishments in Iowa
Education in Jefferson County, Iowa
School districts established in 1868
School districts in Iowa